The 1980 Bowling Green Falcons football team was an American football team that represented Bowling Green University in the Mid-American Conference (MAC) during the 1980 NCAA Division I-A football season. In their fourth season under head coach Denny Stolz, the Falcons compiled a 4–7 record (4–4 against MAC opponents), finished in seventh place in the MAC, and outscored their opponents by a combined total of 189 to 186.

The team's statistical leaders included Greg Taylor with 562 passing yards, Bryant Jones with 806 rushing yards, and Dan Shetler with 310 receiving yards.

Schedule

References

Bowling Green
Bowling Green Falcons football seasons
Bowling Green Falcons football